Jung Da-eun is a South Korean actress and singer. She is best known for her roles in dramas Mystic Pop-up Bar, L.U.C.A.: The Beginning, Coffee, Do Me a Favor and Class of Lies: and a former member of 2Eyes. She also appeared in movies such as Derailed, Justice High and The Witch: Part 1. The Subversion.

Discography

Filmography

Television series

Film

References

External links
 
 

1994 births
Living people
People from Seoul
Actresses from Seoul
Singers from Seoul
21st-century South Korean actresses
South Korean television actresses
South Korean film actresses
South Korean female idols